The Hong Kong Macau Trophy is a Group 3 Thoroughbred handicap horse race in Hong Kong, run at Sha Tin over 1400 metres in early March.

Horses are required to fit four criteria to enter the race.
For horses aged 4 or above which are trained permanently in Hong Kong or Macau.
 For horses rated 110-90 in Hong Kong and horses rated 125-95 in Macau.
 Horses trained in Macau will receive a 15-lb reduction from their Official Macau Rating at time of calculation of weights.
 Horses must have had, at time of publication of weights, at least 2 starts in their respective jurisdictions.

Winners

References 
Racing Post:
 
 Racing Information of Centenary Vase (2011/12)
 The Hong Kong Jockey Club 

Horse races in Hong Kong